

Notable people from Metz

Notable people born in or near Metz (sorted by category):

Activism and politics
 Jean-Jacques Aillagon (1946), French politician and contemporary and modern arts connoisseur
 Charles Ancillon (1659–1715), French jurist and diplomat
 François Barbé-Marbois (1745–1837), French politician
 Jean Burger (1907–1945), French resistant
 Marte Cohn (1920), French spy during World War II
 Désiré Ferry (1886–1940), French politician
 Volker Hassemer (1944), German senator
 Jean Laurain (1921–2008), French philosopher and politician
 Willy Huhn (1909–1970), German council communism theorist
 Pierre Louis Roederer (1754–1835), French politician and economist
 Fritz von Twardowski, German diplomat
Adventure
 Jean Bernanos (1648–1695), French filibuster and privateer
 Jean-François Pilâtre de Rozier (1757–1785), first man to fly in a hot air balloon
Arts
 Walter Curt Behrendt (1884–1945), German-American architect
 Solange Bertrand (1913–2011), French abstract painter, sculptor and engraver
 Christopher Fratin (1801–1864), French animalier sculptor
 Monsù Desidero (1593–ca. 1640), French painter, also known as François de Nomé or Didier Barra
 Louis-Théodore Devilly (1818–1888), French painter
 Oskar Kurt Döbrich (1911–1970), German painter and graphic designer
 Auguste Hussenot (1799–1885), French painter
 Jutta Jol (1896–1981), German actress
 Charles Willy Kayser (1881–1942), German actor
 Abraham-César Lamoureux (c. 1640–1692), French sculptor in Sweden and Denmark
 Tiana Lemnitz (1897–1994), German operatic soprano 
 Jean-Baptiste Le Prince (1734–1781), French etcher and painter
 Charles-Laurent Maréchal (1801–1887), French painter and master glass maker
 Paul Niclausse (1879–1958), French sculptor
 Jean-Marie Straub (1933), French cineast
 Walter Ulbrich (1910–1991), German film producer
 Hugo Becker (1987), French actor
Business
 Thierry Antinori (*1961), French aviation Manager
Literature and poetry
 Joseph Décembre (1836–1906), French writer and freemason
 Otto Flake (1880–1963), German writer
 Rudolf John Gorsleben (1883–1930), German ariosophist
 Pierre Hanot (born 1952), French novelist, visual artist and musician
 Gustave Kahn (1859–1936), French poet
 Bernard-Marie Koltès (1948–1989), French playwright and director
 Wilhelm Michel (1877–1942), German writer
 Ernst Moritz Mungenast (1898–1964), German writer and journalist
 Frieda von Richthofen (1879–1956), German writer
 Raymond Schwartz (1894–1973), German writer and Esperantist
 André Schwarz-Bart (1928–2006), French novelist
 Stephen Michael Stirling (1953), Canadian-American writer
 Paul Verlaine (1844–1896), French poet
 Hermann Wendel (1884–1936), German writer
 Anny Wienbruch (1899–1976), German writer
Military
 Basile Guy Marie Victor Baltus de Pouilly (1766–1845), French general
 Wilhelm Baur (1883–1964), German general
 Hans Benda (1877–1951), German admiral
 Theodor Berkelmann (1894–1943), German general
 Julius von Bernuth (1897–1942), German general
 Ludwig Bieringer (1892–1975), German general
 Helmuth Bode (1907–1985), German officer
 Walter Bordellé (1918–1984), German officer
 Karl Braun, (1885–1945) German pilot
 Arthur von Briesen (1891–1981), German general
 Erich von Brückner (1896–1949), German officer
 Jean Baptiste Noël Bouchotte (1754–1840), French officer
 Peter-Erich Cremer (1911–1992), German officer
 Adam Philippe, Comte de Custine (1740–1793), French general
 Joachim Degener (1883–1953), German general
 Abraham de Fabert (1599–1660/62), Marshal of France
 Kurt von Falkowski (1886–1953), German general
 Wilhelm Falley (1897–1944), German general
 Simon de Faultrier (1763–1815), French general
 Edgar Feuchtinger (1894–1960), German general

 Hans-Henning von Fölkersamb (1889–1984), German general
 Louis Charles Folliot de Crenneville (1763–1840), Austrian general
 Herbert Gundelach (1899–1971), German general
 Heinz Harmel (1906–2000), German general
 Kurt Haseloff (1894–1978), German general
 Johannes Hintz (1898–1944), German general
 Sigmund von Imhoff (1881–1967), German general 
 François Étienne de Kellermann (1770–1835), French general
 Walther Kittel (1887–1971), German general
 Arthur Kobus (1879–1945), German general
 Karl Kriebel (1888–1961), German general
 Otto Krueger (1891–1976), German general
 Henry Dominique Lallemand (1777–1823), French general
 Charles Lallemand (1774–1839), French general
 Joachim-Friedrich Lang (1899–1945), German general
 Antoine Charles Louis Lasalle (1775–1809), French general
 Hans Leistikow (1895–1967), German general
 Hans-Albrech Lehmann (1894–1976), German general
 Joachim von der Lieth-Thomsen (1896–1918), German Pilot
 Rolf von Lilienhoff-Zwowitzky (1895–1956), German naval officer
 Friedrich Marnet (1882–1915), German pilot
 Johannes Mühlenkamp (1910–1986), German officer
 Eugen Müller (1891–1951), German general
 Henri-Joseph Paixhans (1783–1854), French officer
 Ferdinand von Parseval (1791–1854), Bavarian general 
 Joachim Pötter (1913–1992), German officer
 Antoine Richepanse (1770–1802), French general
 Günther Rüdel (1883–1950), German general
 Hans von Salmuth (1888–1962), German general
 Hermann Schaefer (1885–1962), German general
 Ernst Schreder (1892–1941), German general
 Otto Schumann (1886–1952), German general
 Rudolf Schmundt (1896–1944), German general
 Ludwig Weißmüller (1915–1943), German officer
 Ernst Wieblitz (1883–1973), German naval officer
 Charles Victor Woirgard (1764–1810), French general
 Bodo Zimmermann (1886–1963), German general
Music
 Heinrich Bensing (1911–1955), German opera singer
 Philippe Boivin (born 1954), French composer
 Gabriel Pierné (1863–1937), French composer and conductor
 Paul Pierné (1874–1952), French composer and organist
 Hans Pizka (1942), Austrian hornist
 Claude Cymerman (1947), French classical pianist
 Maximilien Simon (1797–1861), French composer
 Ambroise Thomas (1811–1896), French opera composer
 Louis Corte (1972), French songwriter, producer, singer
Religion
 Joseph Coincé (1764–1833), Jesuit and physician
 Rabbenu Gershom (ca. 960–ca. 1028), famous Talmudist and Halakhaist
 Saint Livier of Marsal (ca. 400–451), Christian martyr, defender of Metz against Attila's Huns
 Eliezer ben Samuel of Metz (ca. 1100-1175), Tosafist, author of the halachic work Sefer Yereim 
 Nicolas Janny (1749–1822), priest, pedagogue and grammarian
 Saint Marie-Eugénie de Jésus (1817–1898), founder of the Religious of the Assumption
 Pierre Poiret (1646–1719), Calvinic mystic and philosopher
 Marguerite Rutan (1736–1794), French Roman Catholic religious person, member of the Vincentian Sisters
 Aaron Worms (1754–1836), Rabbi and Tamuldist
Sciences and knowledge
 Max Braubach (1899–1975), German historian
 Laurent de Chazelles (1724–1808) French agronomist
 Robert Folz (1910–1996), French historian
 Louis Le Prince (1842–vanished in 1890), first man to shoot moving images
 Émile Léonard Mathieu (1835–1890), French mathematician
 Victor Nigon (1920-2015), French biologist
 Alfred Pérot (1863–1925), French physician
 Jean-Victor Poncelet (1788–1867), French mathematician
 Karl Süpfle (1880–1942), German physiologist
 Leo Weisgerber (1899–1985), German linguist
 Luise von Winterfeld (1882–1962), German archivist
Sports
 Ginette Bedard (1933), French-American long-distance runner
 Jean-Marcellin Buttin (1991), French rugby union player
 Simon Delestre (1981), French equestrian
 Ugo Humbert (1998), French tennis player
 Morgan Parra (1988), French rugby union player
 Cédric Schille (1975), French former footballer
 Anni Steuer (1913), German athlete
 Bouabdellah Tahri (1978), French athlete
 Heinrich Troßbach (1903–1947), German athlete

Notable people linked to the city of Metz
Notable people linked to Metz (sorted by chronology):

 Hermann von Münster (ca. 1330–1392), Westphalian master glassmaker who realized the western windows of the Saint-Stephen cathedral and was honoured, buried into the cathedral for his artworks.
 François Rabelais (ca. 1494–1553), French Renaissance writer, doctor and Renaissance humanist, came in 1546 in Metz, then a free imperial city and a republic, to escape the condemnation for heresy by the University of Paris.
 Ambroise Paré (ca. 1510–1590), French surgeon, participated to the defense of Metz during the siege of 1552-1553. The journal of the siege of Metz in 1552 reports: "Although born in Laval in the province of Maine, he is regarded as belonging to our pays because of his participation in this memorable action."
 Francis of Lorraine, Duke of Guise (1519–1563), French statesman. Appointed governor of Metz by King Henri II, he successfully defended the city from the forces of Emperor Charles V during the siege of 1552-1553.
 Cardinal Mazarin (1602–1661), French-Italian cardinal, diplomat, and politician, Bishop of Metz between 1652 and 1658.
 Jacques-Bénigne Bossuet (1627–1704), French bishop and theologian, nominated archdeacon in Metz in 1654.
 Charles Louis Auguste Fouquet, duc de Belle-Isle (1684–1761), French general and statesman, governor of the Three Bishoprics and benefactor of the city of Metz. He participated to the edification of the Petit-Saulcy island's buildings including the opera house and the prefecture palace, and the buildings of the town square. Just before his death, he stated: "The city of Metz is my mistress."
 Gilbert du Motier, marquis de Lafayette (1757–1834), French aristocrat and military officer, general in the American Revolutionary War, and leader of the Garde Nationale during the French Revolution, garrison's officer in Metz in 1775.
 Pierre François Joseph Durutte (1767–1827), French divisional general during the Napoleonic Wars, in charge of the defense of Metz against the Sixth Coalition. As rumor was spreading that Metz surrendered during the siege, Emperor Napoleon asked who was in charge of its defense. When Napoleon knew that General Durutte was in command, he claimed: "Then, Metz is still ours." Indeed, Metz did resist until the abdication of the emperor.
 Michel Ney (1769–1815), Marshal of France, received his military education in the hussar's regiment of Metz.
 Alexis de Tocqueville (1805–1859), French political thinker and historian, lived and studied in Metz between 1817 and 1823.
 François Achille Bazaine (1811–1888), French general who surrendered the city during the Franco-Prussian War, condemned afterward for treachery in negotiating with and capitulating to the enemy.
 Heinrich Göring (1838–1913), German jurist and diplomat, lived in Metz between 1873 and 1885.
 Friedrich Nietzsche (1844–1900), German philosopher who participated to the siege of Metz during the Franco-Prussian War.
 Günther von Kluge (1882–1944), German Generalfeldmarschall, committed suicide near Metz.
 George Smith Patton, Jr. (1885–1945), American general who victoriously led the US Army during the Battle of Metz of the Second World War.
 Robert Schuman (1886–1963), Luxembourgish-born French statesman regarded as one of the founders of the European Union, the Council of Europe, and NATO, member of the municipal council of Metz during the interwar period.
 Joachim von Ribbentrop (1893–1946), Foreign Minister of Germany, lived and studied in Metz between 1904 and 1908.
 Adrienne Thomas (pseudonym for Hertha Adrienne Strauch) (1897–1980), German writer, major representative of humanism and pacifism perspectives in Europe during the interwar period. Born in annexed Moselle, she grew up in Metz and remained attached to the city and her native land, despite the vicissitudes of her life due to the first and second world wars, and the Nazi persecution.
 Jean Moulin (1899–1943), French resistant, died in Metz while on a train in transit towards Germany.
 Valentín González (1904–1983), Spanish Republican military commander during the Spanish Civil War who lived in exil in Metz between 1963 and 1978.
 Jean-Marie Pelt (1933), French botanist, founder of the European Institute for Ecology in Metz and member of the municipal council of Metz from 1971 to 1983.
 Robert Pires (1973), 1998 FIFA World Cup and 2000 UEFA European champion footballer, who played for the FC Metz between 1992 and 1998.
 Aurélie Filippetti (1973), French novelist and politician, elected at the French National Assembly by the constituency of Metz.

References

Metz